Bela Madhurya Trivedi (born on 10 June 1960) is a judge of the Supreme Court of India. She had previously been a judge of the Gujarat High Court since 9 February 2016. She formerly served as the additional judge of the Gujarat High Court from  17 February 2011 to 27 June 2011 and later served as the additional judge of the Rajasthan High Court.

References

1960 births
Living people
Gujarati people
Judges of the Gujarat High Court
Judges of the Rajasthan High Court
20th-century Indian lawyers
20th-century Indian women lawyers
21st-century Indian judges
21st-century Indian women judges
Justices of the Supreme Court of India
Maharaja Sayajirao University of Baroda alumni